Anna Karenina: Vronsky's Story is a 2017 Russian drama film directed by Karen Shakhnazarov. An expanded eight-part version titled Anna Karenina aired on the Russia-1 television channel.

It is a free adaptation of Leo Tolstoy's 1877 novel of the same name which also combines the publicistic story "During the Japanese War" and the literary cycle "Stories about the Japanese War" by Vikenty Veresaev.

Plot summary

Cast
 Elizaveta Boyarskaya as Anna Karenina
 Maksim Matveyev as Vronsky
 Kirill Grebenshchikov as Sergey Karenin
 Vitali Kishchenko as Karenin
 Vladimir Ilyin as General
 Dmitry Miller as Aleksandr, Vronsky's brother
 Tatyana Lyutaeva as Countess Vronskaya
 Viktoriya Isakova as Dolly
 Evdokiya Germanova as Countess Kartasova
 Ivan Kolesnikov as Stepan Arkadievich Oblonsky

Reception
The majority of viewers reacted negatively to the film. On Rotten Tomatoes, 20% of reviewers gave the film a positive score.

References

External links
 
 

2017 films
2017 drama films
2017 Russian television series debuts
2017 Russian television series endings
2010s Russian television series
Russia-1 original programming
Russian television miniseries
Russian television films
Russian drama films
2010s Russian-language films
Films based on Anna Karenina
Films directed by Karen Shakhnazarov
Films scored by Yuri Poteyenko